Ufo abei is a species of gall wasp in the genus Ufo. It was first discovered in Japan. It was the first species described in the genus.

References

Cynipidae
Insects described in 2005